Peppange is a small town in the commune of Roeser, in southern Luxembourg. , the town has a population of 570.

It has a Benedictine convent which is still active (rue St. Benoit), as well as a parish church.

Roeser
Towns in Luxembourg